Zein al-Sharaf bint Jamil (2 August 1916 – 26 April 1994) was the Queen of Jordan as the wife of King Talal. Queen Zein was the mother of King Hussein.

Family
She was born in Alexandria, Egypt, into a family of Hejazi and Turkish Cypriot origin. Her mother was Wijdan Hanim, the daughter of Shakir Pasha, who was the grandnephew of the Ottoman-Turkish Cypriot Governor of Cyprus Kâmil Pasha. Her father, Sharif Jamil bin Nasser, was the Governor of Hauran; he was the nephew of Sharif Hussein bin Ali of Mecca. Her paternal aunts were Musbah bint Nasser and Huzaima bint Nasser.

Marriage and children
Zein married her first cousin Prince Talal bin Abdullah of Jordan on 27 November 1934, with whom she had four sons and two daughters:

 King Hussein (14 November 1935 – 7 February 1999)
 Princess Asma (deceased, at birth in 1937)
 Prince Muhammad (2 October 1940 – 29 April 2021)
 Prince Hassan (born 20 March 1947)
 Prince Muhsin (deceased)
 Princess Basma (born 11 May 1951)

Career
Queen Zein played a major role in the political development of the Jordanian Kingdom in the early 1950s, by supporting efforts in charitable works and women's rights.

She took part in the writing of the 1952 Constitution that gave certain rights to women and enhanced the social development of the country. She also created the first women’s union of Jordan in 1944. Queen Zein further filled a constitutional vacuum after the assassination of the late King Abdullah I in 1951, while the newly proclaimed King Talal was being treated outside the Kingdom. The Queen again performed this role during the period between August 1952, when her son, King Hussein, was proclaimed monarch, and May 1953, when he assumed constitutional duties at the age of eighteen.

Following the arrival of Palestinian refugees into Jordan after the 1948 Arab-Israeli War, she led national relief efforts to help the tens of thousands of refugees. She was also instrumental in establishing the women's branch of the Jordan National Red Crescent Society in 1948. Throughout her life, Queen Zein dedicated time and energy to the Um Al Hussein orphanage in Amman.

Honours

National honours
  : 
 Dame Grand Cordon with Collar of the Order of al-Hussein bin Ali.

Foreign honours
  : 
 Honorary Grand Commander of the Order of the Defender of the Realm (SMN (K)) - Tun (24 April 1965)

References

External links

1916 births
1994 deaths
20th-century Arabs
Arab queens
Jordanian royal consorts
Jordanian people of Turkish descent
Jordanian people of Egyptian descent
Women humanitarians
People from Alexandria
House of Hashim
Jordanian activists
Jordanian women activists
Jordanian Muslims
20th-century philanthropists
Honorary Grand Commanders of the Order of the Defender of the Realm
20th-century women philanthropists
20th-century Jordanian women
Queen mothers